Kay Everett (19412004) was a member of Detroit City Council from 1991 to 2004.  Everett was a graduate of Cass Technical High School, and Wayne State University.  She was on the Detroit Board of Education prior to becoming a Detroit City Council member.  Prior to that she was an English teacher for Detroit Public Schools.

Everett was a native Detroiter who grew up on the east side of the city. On Thanksgiving Day 2004 she succumbed unexpectedly to kidney disease. Her hats and other memorabilia were donated to both the African American Museum and Detroit Historical Museum.

References

1941 births
2004 deaths
Wayne State University alumni
Detroit City Council members
Women city councillors in Michigan
20th-century American politicians
20th-century American women politicians
Members of the Detroit Board of Education
21st-century American women